AS-level can refer to:
Advanced Subsidiary level, a public examination taken for the General Certificate of Education, with a smaller course content than an A level.
Advanced Supplementary level, an old qualification which was part of the UK Advanced level system prior to 2000
Hong Kong Advanced Supplementary Level Examination

See also 
 AS (disambiguation)